A State Surgeon General is the operational head and senior spokesperson on public health in a single state of the United States of America, the state equivalent of the Surgeon General of the United States.

Pennsylvania created the position of "physician general" in 1996. Michigan had their first surgeon general in 2003, followed by Arkansas and Florida in 2007. In 2019, California became the fifth state to establish such an office.

List of positions
 Surgeon General of Arkansas
 Surgeon General of California
 Surgeon General of Florida
 Physician General of Pennsylvania
 Surgeon General of Michigan

See also
 State governments of the United States
 State constitutional officer (United States)
 Surgeon general

References

United States Department of Health and Human Services officials